Tschop may refer to:
Chop, Ukraine
Matija Čop (1797–1835), Slovenian linguist
Matthias Tschöp, (born 1967), German physician

See also 
Tschopp, a surname